= Peter Döhle Schiffahrts-KG =

- Company type: Privately held company
- Industry: Maritime Services
- Founded: 1956
- Headquarters: Hamburg, Germany
- Number of employees: 6,800
- Website: www.doehle.de

Peter Döhle Schiffahrts-KG ("PD") is a seaborne shipping company and maritime service provider headquartered in Hamburg, Germany. It is the parent holding company of the Döhle Group which has several affiliates and is operating worldwide. The Company owns and operates a fleet of container vessels, multi-purpose vessels and bulk carriers. The group of companies employs worldwide around 4,800 crew members as well as 2,000 employees ashore.

== History ==
The company was originally established in 1956 by Peter Döhle and acted as a so-called "Vertrauensmakler" (i.e. agent to ship owners in Germany). Döhle, one of the most prominent ship owner from Hamburg, died on May 24, 2002, at the age of 75.

Since 1999, Jochen Döhle, Peter Döhle's son, is the principle and managing partner for the Döhle Group. Per January 1, 2005, Mr. Christoph joined as personally liable and managing partner in the company. Since its beginning, the company has significantly increased the size of its managed fleet as well as its range of services.

== Fleet ==
Döhle Group is entrusted with the operation of a fleet of vessels of about 400 container vessels, multi-purpose ships and bulk carriers. Today´s fleet encompasses container vessels with a capacity of 300 up to 13,000 TEU, multi-purpose carriers and bulk carriers ranging from 1,800 to about 210,000 dwt deadweight.

== Corporate development ==
Throughout the last decades the group continuously invested in and cooperated with a number of partners in the field of shipping. In 2009, PD took over shares in the Chilean container line CSAV. After working together for more than 30 years, PD acquired shares in the Slovenian bulk carrier owner Splosna Plovba. In 2011, Döhle Group established a joint venture together with Yangzijiang Shipbuilding Group in order to mutually own a set of bulk carriers. Most recently, PD established a joint venture with the comparable shipping giant Costamare Shipping called Blue Net Chartering GmbH in February, 2018 providing charter broking services for a fleet of about 220 container vessels.
